The Tunisian Super Cup or the Tunisia Premier Cup was previously called the Tunisian Cup Winners' Cup.

It is a Tunisian football competition organized by the Tunisian Football Federation. Established in 1960, it combines the champions of the first Tunisian Ligue Professionnelle 1 against the champions of the Tunisian Cup.

History

First editions and frequent interruptions
Formerly called the Cup of Cups, it was organized as part of President Habib Bourguiba's birthday celebrations. According to the laws of the Tunisian Football Federation, it is a competition that takes place every year, but since its return in 1994 it has only been organized three times in 1994, 1995 and 2001.

The 2007–2008 season was to be held on 7 February 2009 between the champions of Tunisian Ligue Professionnelle 1 Club Africain and the Tunisian Cup holders of Espérance de Tunis, but the match did not take place because of the intensity of the calendar, especially after the adoption of two new Maghreb competitions, as well as the next match, which was scheduled on 20 February 2010. Espérance de Tunis, who won the Tunisian Ligue Professionnelle 1 in and Olympique Béja the Tunisian Cup holders, also did not meet.

Back to the front (since 2019)
After a hiatus of 18 years, the next edition of the Tunisian Super Cup was held on 1 April 2019 at Abdullah bin Khalifa Stadium in Doha, Qatar. Between Espérance de Tunis (Champion of the 2017–18 Tunisian Ligue Professionnelle 1) and Club Athletic Bizertin (the fifth of the 2017–18 Tunisian Ligue Professionnelle 1) as a substitute for Club Africain (2017–18 Tunisian Cup champion).

The match was supposed to be played between Espérance de Tunis, the champion of the Tunisian Ligue Professionnelle 1, and Club Africain, the champion of the Tunisian Cup. Secondly, the selection for the 2017–18 Tunisian Cup runner-up, Etoile Sportive du Sahel, who refused the invitation due to the overcrowded calendar, finally reached a solution with Club Athletic Bizertin (the fifth of the 2017–18 Tunisian Ligue Professionnelle 1 and one of the semi-finalists of the 2017–18 Tunisian Cup).Esperance Sportive de Tunis won the title for the fourth time in its history in the first edition in 18 years, after winning the match with a score of 2–1.

After next season, On February 10, 2019, the Tunisian Football Federation decided to fix the match date to March 15, 2020. However, the match was postponed to September 20, 2020, due to the COVID-19 pandemic in Tunisia. Finally the match was played on 20 September 2020 at Stade Olympique de Radès in Rades, Tunisia. between 2018–19 Ligue 1 winners Espérance ST and 2018–19 Tunisian Cup winners CS Sfaxien. Esperance won the title for the fifth time in its history.
The 2019–20 Tunisian Super Cup was scheduled to be played on July 30, 2021, but like the previous version, the match was postponed to September 18, 2021 due to the COVID-19 pandemic in Tunisia. The match was played on the pitch of the Stade Olympique de Radès between Espérance de Tunis (Champion of the 2019–20 Tunisian Ligue Professionnelle 1) and US Monastir (2019–20 Tunisian Cup champion), after the end of the regular time with a 1–1 draw, the US Monastir decided the title on penalties 5–3.

The 2020–21 Tunisian Super Cup match was played on September 25, 2021, a week after the previous edition, on the pitch of the Stade Olympique de Radès between Espérance de Tunis (Champion of the 2020–21 Tunisian Ligue Professionnelle 1) and CS Sfaxien (2020–21 Tunisian Cup champion). Espérance de Tunis won the title for the sixth time in its history, after winning the match 1–0 with the goal of Anayo Iwuala in the 57th minute.

Finals

Performances

Performance by club

See also
Tunisian Ligue Professionnelle 1
Tunisian Cup

Notes

References

Football in Tunisia
Tunisia
3